European Parliament elections were held in Romania on 26 May 2019.

Background

Social Democratic Party (PSD) 

In April 2019, the Party of European Socialists (PES) announced on Wednesday that it would freeze relations with the Social Democrats (PSD) at least until June, citing concerns about the rule of law in the country. Since then the (PSD) moved further to Euroscepticism. Victor Ponta, who was expelled from the PSD in 2017, said "The PSD unfortunately has turned to a very populist, very nationalistic, demagogic party," he said.

National Liberal Party (PNL)
Three days after the 2014 election, on 28 May 2014, National Liberal Party president Crin Antonescu announced that the party would change European affiliation from ALDE to EPP, and it has started negotiations for the merger with the Democratic Liberal Party. The newly created party would still be called National Liberal Party, and be a member of the EPP. Democratic Liberal Party president Vasile Blaga later that day confirmed the merger of the two parties. MEP Norica Nicolai, first candidate on the National Liberal Party list refused to join the European People's Party group, and continued to stay a member of the Alliance of Liberals and Democrats for Europe group. After the 2014 presidential election, MEP Renate Weber, second candidate on the National Liberal Party list, resigned the European People's Party group, and joined the Alliance of Liberals and Democrats for Europe group. After the completion of the merger of the two parties, the two MEPs were given an ultimatum to join the European People's Party group or face party exclusion. They failed to fulfill the request and thus were expelled from the National Liberal Party, and currently stand with the Alliance of Liberals and Democrats for Europe group. Later, MEP Norica Nicolai joined the Alliance of Liberals and Democrats.

In late August 2017, MEP Ramona Mănescu, third candidate on the National Liberal Party list, resigned the party, but continued to stand with the European People's Party group.

In May 2018, People's Movement Party MEP Siegfried Mureșan, spokesman of the European People's Party, announced he is leaving the party to join the National Liberal Party.

Journalist Rareș Bogdan, formerly a staunch opponent to the liberals, was officially nominated as head of the PNL list for the European Parliament elections, which also contains, among others, former co-president of PNL Vasile Blaga, MEPs Siegfried Mureșan, Adina Vălean, Daniel Buda, Cristian Bușoi, Marian-Jean Marinescu and Mihai Țurcanu, and mayors Mircea Hava and Gheorghe Falcă.

Democratic Liberal Party (PDL)
Three days after the 2014 election, on 28 May 2014, Democratic Liberal Party president Vasile Blaga confirmed the announcement made by  National Liberal Party president Crin Antonescu, that the two parties were to merge into a new party, that would retain the name of the latter and international affiliation of the former. To express discontent with this decision, and the lack of a PDL candidate to the presidential election, MEP Monica Macovei, second candidate on the Democratic Liberal Party list resigned the party in September 2014, and competed in the 2014 presidential election as an independent. Following the presidential election, she joined, as an independent politician, the European Conservatives and Reformists.

People's Movement Party (PMP)
In September 2014, following some declarations, Cristian Preda, first candidate on the People's Movement Party list, was expelled from the party. He continued to stand in the European People's Party group.

In 2016, the People's Movement Party merged with (absorbed) the National Union for the Progress of Romania, but the later's MEPs did not join the People's Movement Party.

In May 2018, MEP Siegfried Mureșan, spokesman of the European People's Party, announced he is leaving the People's Movement Party, to join the National Liberal Party. As a result, the People's Movement Party lost both its MEPs.

Conservative Party (PC)
The Conservative Party ran with the National Union for the Progress of Romania on a common list headed by the Social Democratic Party at the previous election. This electoral alliance was supposed to be called "Social Democratic Union" ("Uniunea Social Democrată"), but, due to the Romanian legislation (this name was taken by a 1990s alliance between the Democratic Party and Romanian Social Democratic Party), they ran as "PSD-UNPR-PC". In 2015, the party merged with the Liberal Reformist Party, to form the Alliance of Liberals and Democrats Members displeased with this decision, headed by MEP Maria Grapini (first Conservative Party candidate, and fifth on the PSD-UNPR-PC list), founded a new party, Humanist Power Party (Social-Liberal). She continues to stand with the Progressive Alliance of Socialists and Democrats, as a member of PPU-SL. Laurențiu Rebega, second Conservative Party candidate and fourteenth on the PSD-UNPR-PC list, sat as an independent politician in the Non-Inscrits group, before joining PRO Romania and the ECR.

National Union for the Progress of Romania (UNPR)
The National Union for the Progress of Romania ran with the Conservative Party on a common list headed by the Social Democratic Party at the previous election. This electoral alliance was supposed to be called "Social Democratic Union" ("Uniunea Social Democrată"), but, due to the Romanian legislation (this name was taken by a 1990s alliance between the Democratic Party and Romanian Social Democratic Party), they ran as "PSD-UNPR-PC". In 2016, the National Union for the Progress of Romania merged with (was absorbed by) the People's Movement Party, but the former's MEPs did not join the People's Movement Party. Both its two candidates continue to stand with the Progressive Alliance of Socialists and Democrats: Damian Drăghici (first National Union for the Progress of Romania candidate and sixth on the "PSD-UNPR-PC" list) as an independent member, and Doru Frunzulică (second National Union for the Progress of Romania candidate and thirteenth on the "PSD-UNPR-PC" list) joined the Social Democratic Party.

Opinion polls

Candidates and Elected MEPs 

The Central Electoral Bureau publishes the lists the latest in 24 hours after they have been registered by the parties.

National Liberal Party (PNL)
 Rareș Bogdan
 Mircea Hava
 Siegfried Mureșan
 Vasile Blaga
 Adina Vălean
 Daniel Buda
 Dan Motreanu
 Gheorghe Falcă
 Cristian Bușoi
 Marian Jean Marinescu
 Vlad Nistor
 Mihai Țurcanu
 Violeta Alexandru
 Ligia Popescu
 Ana Dimitriu
 Mădălin Teodosescu
 Alexandru Epure
 Ciprian Ciucu
 Aleodor Frâncu
 Claudia Benchescu
 Adrian Dupu
 Dragoș Soare
 Ionel Palăr
 Tudor Polak
 Emanuel Soare
 Marius Minea
 Alexandru Șerban
 Claudiu Chira
 Alexandru Salup-Rusu
 Ilie Cotinescu
 Cosmina Neamțu
 Alexandru Părduț
 Costel Stanca
 Gheorghe Firon
 Cristina Chivu
 Sorina Marin
 Daniel Grosu
 Alexandru Țoncu
 Viorica Mihai
 Adrian Dabarac
 Larissa Bîrsan
 Ioan Chirteș
 Ion Vela

Social Democratic Party (PSD)

 Rovana Plumb
 Carmen Avram
 Claudiu Manda
 Chris Terhes
 Dan Nica
 Maria Grapini
 Tudor Ciuhodaru
 Dragos Benea
 Victor Negrescu
 Andi Cristea
 Natalia Intotero
 Gabriela Zoană
 Bianca Gavriliţă
 Emilian Pavel
 Doina Pană
 Crina-Fiorela Chilat
 Mariana Bălănică
 Răzvan Popa
 Luminița Jivan
 Alin Pavelescu
 Augustin Ioan
 Cătălin Grigore
 Roxana Pațurcă
 Oana Florea
 Dragoș Cristian
 Mihai Ion Macaveiu
 Liviu Brăiloiu
 Florin Manole
 Ion Voinea
 Horia Grama
 Alexandru Popa
 Aida Căruceru
 Gheorghe Tomoioagă
 Anca Daniela Raiciu
 Mitică Marius Mărgărit
 Nasi Calențaru
 Cristina Tăteață
 Petru Moț
 Luminița Țundrea
 Emanuel Iacob
 Cătălin Unciuleanu
 Gabriel Bogdan Răducan
 Andrei Sima

2020 USR-PLUS Alliance (USR PLUS) 

 Dacian Cioloș (PLUS)
 Cristian Ghinea (USR) 
 Dragos Nicolae Pîslaru (PLUS)
 Clotilde Armand (USR) 
 Ioan Dragoș Tudorache (PLUS)
 Nicolae Ștefănuță (USR)
 Vlad Botoș (USR)
 Ramona Victoria Strugariu (PLUS) 
 Vlad Gheorghe (USR) 
 Alin Cristian Mituța (PLUS)
 Naomi Reniuț Ursoiu (USR)
 Oana Țoiu (PLUS)
 Radu Ghelmez (USR) 
 Liviu Iolu (PLUS) 
 Radu Mihaiu (USR) 
 Iulian Lorincz (USR) 
 Adriana Cristian (USR) 
 Camelia Crișan (USR)
 Anca Majaru (PLUS) 
 George Țăranu (USR)
 Bogdan Deleanu (PLUS) 
 Ștefan Pălărie (PLUS)
 Silviu Gurlui (USR) 
 Alexandru Grigorescu Negri (PLUS) 
 Teodora Stoian (USR) 
 George Gima (PLUS) 
 Alexandru Vărzaru (USR)
 Raluca Amariei (USR) 
 Anca Radu (PLUS) 
 Miroslav Tașcu Stavre (USR)
 Gabriela Maria Mirescu Gruber (PLUS) 
 Florin Andrei (USR) 
 Cătălina-Teodora Sofron (PLUS) 
 Sorin Dan Clinci (PLUS) 
 Emanuel Stoica (USR) 
 Iulian Crăciun (PLUS)
 Octavian Berceanu (USR) 
 Daniela Șerban (PLUS)
 Cristina Iurișniți (USR)
 Elena Uram (USR)

PRO Romania (PRO)

 Victor Ponta
 Corina Crețu
 Mihai Tudose
 Iurie Leancă 
 Geanina Puşcaşu
 Gabriela Podască
 Cristian Cosmin
 Ioana Petrescu
 Mihai Sturzu 
 Ionela Danciu

Democratic Alliance of Hungarians in Romania (UDMR/RMDSZ) 

 Iuliu Winkler
 Loránt Vincze
 Csilla Hegedüs
 Csongor Oltean
 Csaba Sógor
 Irénke Kovács
 Attila Cseke
 Erika Benkő
 Csaba Pataki
 Zsombor Ambrus
 Ildikó Szőcs
 Péter Faragó
 Izabella Ambrus
 Mária Búzás-Fekete
 Attila-Zoltán Csibi
 Márta Máté
 Gábor Kereskényi
 Dalma Pető
 Róbert István Szilágyi
 Ildikó Tripon
 Atilla Lehel Décsei
 Anna Bogya
 István-Balázs Birtalan
 Vilmos Meleg
 Ida Marina
 Hunor Jenő András
 László Derzsi
 Imelda Tóásó
 Károly Kolcsár
 Béla Bors
 Emőke Kerekes
 Botond Balázs
 Róbert Kiss
 Hunor Mákszem
 Éva Hudácsek
 Lajos Papp
 Orsolya Béres
 Gábor Imre
 Tímea Orbán
 Géza Antal
 Mária Gorbai
 Levente Erős
 Hunor Kelemen

People's Movement Party (PMP)

 Traian Băsescu
 Eugen Tomac
 Ioana Constantin
 Marius Paşcan
 Simona Vlădica
 Robert Turcescu
 Teodora Desagă
 Petru Movilă
 Cătălina Bozianu
 Cătălin Bulf

Parties and candidates that did not pass the threshold 
 Alliance of Liberals and Democrats (ALDE)
 Peter Costea (independent candidate)
 George Simion (independent candidate)
 Gregoriana Carmen Tudoran (independent candidate)
 National Union for the Progress of Romania (UNPR)
 Prodemo Party
 United Romania Party (PRO)
 Romanian Socialist Party
 Independent Social Democratic Party
 National Unity Block - NUB

Rejected candidates and lists 

 Octavian-Iulian Tiron
 Freemen's Party
 Ana Daniela Dobre
 Party of Democracy and Solidarity - Demos
 Pensioners' Force Party
 Communitarian Party of Romania
 Greater Romania Party
 Gabriela-Ștefania Nuț
 Ilie Rotaru
 Sevastița Dumitrache
 Luminița Velciu
 Alexandra Ana Maria Gafița (Prodemo Party)
 Romanian Nationhood Party
 Our Romania Party
 New Romania Party
 Liberal Right
 The Right Alternative

Results

MEP's gender balance 

Romania's constitutive session for the year 2019 was represented by 29% women and 71% men.

Notes 

 The Social Democratic Party (PSD) ran in 2014 as part of the a three-party alliance that also included the Conservative Party (PC, a founding member of the ALDE party in 2015) and the National Union for the Progress of Romania (UNPR). Initially it intended to run as "Social Democratic Union" (USD), but, as the same name was used by an alliance in the 1990s by the now longtime defunct Democratic Party (PD) and Social Democratic Party of Romania (PSDR), they ran as "PSD-UNPR-PC Alliance".
 Save Romania Union (USR) and Freedom, Unity and Solidarity Party (PLUS) ran together under the moniker 2020 USR-PLUS Alliance.
 Includes the Civic Force (FC) (2,6% in 2014), which merged into the Democratic Liberal Party (PDL) in July 2014, which itself subsequently merged into the PNL in November 2014.

References

External links

 Central Electoral Bureau for the European Parliament Elections

Romania
2019
May 2019 events in Romania
2019 elections in Romania